The Melones Dam, also known as the Mayarí Dam, is a concrete-face rock-fill dam on the Mayarí River about  south of Mayarí in Holguín Province, Cuba. It is the tallest dam in the country and the center-piece of the East–West Transvase System.

Overview
The system aims to connect various watersheds in the water-rich Holguín Province to cities and towns within the province and to the drier Las Tunas and Camagüey Provinces to the west. The project is still under construction but when complete it will comprise six reservoirs and hundreds of miles of canals and pipes. Its  reservoir will help supply much of the water. Within the system, it will connect to the Sabanilla Reservoir to the west and the Levisa Reservoir to the east.

History
The project originally began in the 1980s but stalled due to economic problems. It since restarted in 2005 under the supervision of the Cuban Revolutionary Armed Forces. The first phase was complete in 2009 and the Melones Dam was finished in 2011.

References

Dams in Cuba
Concrete-face rock-fill dams
Interbasin transfer
Mayarí
Buildings and structures in Holguín Province
Dams completed in 2011
2011 establishments in Cuba
21st-century architecture in Cuba